The coast is where the land meets the sea or ocean.

Coast, Coastal, or Coastline may also refer to:

Places
Coast (PAT station), a station on the Port Authority of Allegheny County's light rail network
Coast at Lakeshore East, a Chicago residential skyscraper
Coast Province, a province in Kenya
Coast Region, a region in Tanzania
The Coast, Newark, New Jersey, a neighborhood in Newark, New Jersey

Arts, entertainment, and media

Music

Groups and labels
Coast (folk rock band), an English folk rock band on Awen Records, 2007
Coast (Scottish band) 1991-1996
Coasts (band), an indie-pop quintet from Bristol, England
The Coast (band), a Canadian band on Aporia Records

Albums
Coastal (Godstar album)
Coastal (The Field Mice album)

Songs
"Coast" (song), a 2022 song by Hailee Steinfeld featuring Anderson Paak

Periodicals
Coast (magazine), a consumer magazine about the British seaside
Coastal Leader, a newspaper in Kingston, South Australia

Other uses in arts, entertainment, and media
Coast (radio station), a New Zealand radio station, started in 2005
Coast (TV series), a BBC TV documentary series
Coastline (sculpture), a 1993 outdoor sculpture by American artist Jim Sanborn
Coast (film), a 2022 film featuring Melissa Leo
Coastlines (film), a 2002 dramatic film

Brands and enterprises
Coast (clothing), British women's clothing retail chain
Coast (soap), a brand of bar soap and body wash, currently manufactured by High Ridge Brands

Schools
 COAST Laboratory (Computer Operations, Audit, and Security Technology), of Purdue University
 Coastal Carolina University in South Carolina, or its athletic program, the Coastal Carolina Chanticleers

Science and technology
Coast (web browser), a web browser developed by Opera Software
Cache on a stick (COAST), computer memory
Cambridge Optical Aperture Synthesis Telescope, an astronomical optical interferometer

Other uses
Coastal (horse) (1976–2005), American Thoroughbred racehorse
Coastal Corporation, an American oil company
Coasting or gliding, a technique of driving a manual transmission car
Cooperative Alliance for Seacoast Transportation (COAST), a public bus system in the coastal region of New Hampshire, United States
Team Coast, a German professional cycling team year 2000

See also
The Coast (disambiguation)
Coast to Coast (disambiguation)
Coaster (disambiguation)
Coasting (disambiguation)
East Coast (disambiguation)
North Coast (disambiguation)
South Coast (disambiguation)
West Coast (disambiguation)